Summerton Mill is a British children's television series created by Pete Bryden and Ed Cookson. It was first shown on the CBeebies channel in 2005 as a segment of the BBC's Tikkabilla. It has subsequently been repeated both within Tikkabilla and as a standalone show on CBeebies and BBC2.

It is a stop-motion animated series featuring the characters Dan, his companion Fluffa, Dr and Mrs Naybhur who live up on the hill, Francoise the cow, Mousey-Tongue the cat, two "yellow-spinner" chickens and the "millfreaks", tiny creatures which appear to resemble small, furry hedgehogs.

In all, twenty-six episodes (and a pilot episode) have been produced, and the show has been broadcast in several European and Middle Eastern countries, including Iceland, Finland, Slovenia, Slovakia, and Iran.

As at April 2021, the second series has not been seen on UK television, even though it has been broadcast in over 85 countries around the world.

Additional information
Pete Bryden and Ed Cookson created Summerton Mill based on Pete Bryden's original concept. They designed the sets and the characters, built the sets and the puppets, painted the backdrops, wrote the scripts, edited the video and sound, animated most of the first series and wrote and performed the music. A small production team was drafted in for the second series when the assistant animator of Series 1, James Cleland, was promoted to Director of Animation.

The series is voiced by Silas Hawkins, whose father (Peter Hawkins) provided the voices of Bill and Ben, Captain Pugwash, the Daleks and the Woodentops.

Although the series is made very much in the style of Oliver Postgate's Smallfilms, much of the background humour is in a similar vein to that of Aardman Animation's Creature Comforts.

Summerton Mill was inspired by Somerton Mill, a riverside property which was owned by Pete Bryden. It was at this secluded riverside location that the project was conceived and the pilot episode was filmed.

The iTeddy children's media player, featured on the British TV series Dragons' Den, was distributed throughout the United Kingdom via the Argos chain of stores and came loaded with an episode of Summerton Mill, with others available from the iTeddy website.

Episodes

 Pilot episode (Extended Introduction)
 "The Hole"
 "Kite Flying"
 "The Sock Thing"
 "Wing Nuts"
 "Hiding"
 "Dr Naybhur's Song"
 "Cheering Up"
 "The Baby Millfreak"
 "Lost and Found"
 "Mrs Naybhur's Vegetables" (Rework of the pilot episode)
 "Chinese Whispers"
 "The Picnic"
 "Mrs Naybhur's Poem"
 "Buried Treasure"
 "Counting the Stones"
 "Dan's Amazing Magic Show"
 "The Lazy Day"
 "Dan's Little Job"
 "Laughing"
 "The Story"
 "Painting"
 "Statue"
 "Dan's Seeds"
 "Dr Naybhur's Balloon"
 "The Bottle Organ"
 "The Present"

Notes

External links
Summerton Mill Studio site
The official Summerton Mill Interactive site
Summerton Mill on toonhound.com

2005 British television series debuts
BBC children's television shows
Animated preschool education television series
British stop-motion animated television series